Fulk Lloyd (c. 1515 – in or shortly before 1597) of Foxhall in Henllan, Denbighshire, was a Welsh politician.

He was a Member (MP) of the Parliament of England for Denbigh Boroughs in November 1554.

References

1515 births
1597 deaths
Members of the Parliament of England for Denbighshire
Members of the Parliament of England (pre-1707) for constituencies in Wales
English MPs 1554–1555